James C. Harris (born September 18, 1946) is a former American football cornerback in the National Football League for the Washington Redskins and the Cincinnati Bengals. He played college football at Howard Payne University and was drafted in the seventh round of the 1970 NFL Draft.

1946 births
Living people
People from Brownwood, Texas
American football cornerbacks
Washington Redskins players
Cincinnati Bengals players